Oum Chheang Sun (1 June 1900 – 1963) was Prime Minister of Cambodia from March to October 1951, and again from January to February 1956.

References

1900 births
20th-century Cambodian politicians 
Prime Ministers of Cambodia
Defence ministers of Cambodia
Interior ministers of Cambodia 
Democratic Party (Cambodia) politicians
People from Kampong Cham province
1963 deaths
Sangkum politicians